Elle (or , plural:  , , or ) is a neopronoun in Spanish intended as an alternative to the third-person gender-specific pronouns  ("he") and  ("she"). It is supposed to be used when the gender of a person is not known or when it is not desirable to specify the person as either "he" or "she". It is not endorsed by any Spanish-language academy or institution. It is an equivalent of the singular they pronoun when used for gendering purposes.

On 27 October 2020, the Royal Spanish Academy (RAE) briefly incorporated the pronoun into its Word Observatory, a new section of their website relaunched on 23 October 2020, with the following definition:

On 30 October 2020, four days after its inclusion, the RAE decided to remove the word from its portal due to the confusion generated by its presence, and declared: "When the functioning and mission of this section is widely disseminated, it will be reassessed".

History 
Initially, the characters @ or x were used on social networks, blogs and other websites to express the neutral gender in Spanish, but the result was not satisfactory because they could not be pronounced. For that reason, and although both options are still used, consensus by promoters of a Spanish gender-neutral language was reached to use e as the ending for the neutral grammatical gender and elle as the neutral pronoun. The first person to propose it was the British blogger Sophia Gubb and, because of its ease, this is now the most widespread option used by supporters of these ideas. For this reason, several campaigns have been launched in order to get the pronoun included in the RAE. In December 2021, the RAE included the word  in its dictionary, however not as a pronoun but defined as a digraph/sound of ll.

See also 

 Gender-neutral language
 Gender-neutral pronoun
 Neopronoun
 Pronoun game
 Iel (pronoun)
 Ri (pronoun)
 Feminist language planning
 Lavender linguistics
 Latinx

References 

Gender-neutral pronouns
Spanish language
2010s neologisms